Tobias Thulin (born 5 July 1995) is a Swedish handball player who plays for GOG Håndbold and the Swedish national team.

Achievements 
  EHF European League 2021 with SC Magdeburg
  Danish Handball Cup 2022 with GOG Håndbold

References 

1995 births
Living people
Swedish male handball players
Handball players from Gothenburg
Redbergslids IK players
SC Magdeburg players
Handball-Bundesliga players
Expatriate handball players
Swedish expatriate sportspeople in Denmark
Swedish expatriate sportspeople in Germany
21st-century Swedish people